Aerangis modesta is a species of epiphytic orchid native to Madagascar and to the Comoro Islands.

References

modesta
Flora of Madagascar
Flora of the Comoros
Epiphytic orchids
Plants described in 1883